"Sprawl II (Mountains Beyond Mountains)" (also known simply as "Sprawl II") is a song by Canadian indie rock band Arcade Fire. It was released as the sixth and final single from their third studio album, The Suburbs, on April 21, 2012. Two music videos were released for the song, one "traditional" and one interactive, both of which were released on December 13, 2011.

Composition
"Sprawl II" is a synthpop song. It features vocals delivered by Arcade Fire band member Régine Chassagne and was primarily inspired by the 2003 Tracy Kidder book Mountains Beyond Mountains.

Release
"Sprawl II" was released as a 12-inch single on April 21, 2012 as part of Record Store Day 2012. A remixed version of the song appears as the A-side, with a remixed version of another track from The Suburbs, "Ready to Start", as the B-side. Both remixes were done by Canadian music producer Damian Taylor.

Music video
A music video for "Sprawl II", lasting five minutes and forty seconds, was released by Merge Records on December 13, 2011, prior the song's physical release, through YouTube. The video was directed by Vincent Morisset and primarily features Régine Chassagne throughout the video. An interactive version of the music video was also made available, where the user can determine the video's speed by dancing along using their webcam.

Track listing
 Merge / Sonovox — MRG442

Charts

Release history

References

2010 songs
2012 singles
Arcade Fire songs
Canadian synth-pop songs
Merge Records singles
Songs written by William Butler (musician)
Songs written by Win Butler
Songs written by Régine Chassagne
Songs written by Jeremy Gara
Songs written by Tim Kingsbury
Songs written by Richard Reed Parry